Gustav Ernst Stresemann (10 May 1878 – 3 October 1929) was a German statesman who served as chancellor in 1923 (for 102 days) and as foreign minister from 1923 to 1929, during the Weimar Republic.

His most notable achievement was the reconciliation between Germany and France, for which he and French Prime Minister Aristide Briand received the Nobel Peace Prize in 1926. During a period of political instability and fragile, short-lived governments, he was the most influential cabinet member in most of the Weimar Republic's existence. During his political career, he represented three successive liberal parties; he was the dominant figure of the German People's Party during the Weimar Republic.

Early years
Stresemann was born on 10 May 1878 in 66 Köpenicker Straße in Southeast Berlin, the youngest of seven children.  His father worked as a beer bottler and distributor, and also ran a small bar out of the family home, as well as renting rooms for extra money.  The family was lower middle class, but relatively well-off for the neighbourhood, and had sufficient funds to provide Gustav with a high-quality education.
Stresemann was an excellent student, particularly excelling in German literature and poetry. At the age of 16, he joined the Andreas Gymnasium to study. His parents brought him up to have an interest in books — he was especially passionate about history, with his teacher, Mr. Wolff, commenting that he had an "almost sickly taste in history." He took an interest in Napoleon and Johann Wolfgang von Goethe, whom he later wrote about in his work 1924: Goethe und Napoleon: ein Vortrag. His mother, Mathilde, died in 1895. From December 1895, he wrote "Berlin letters" for the Dresdener Volks-Zeitung, often talking about politics and targeting Prussian conservatives. In an essay written when he left school, he noted that he would have enjoyed becoming a teacher, but he would only have been qualified to teach languages or the natural sciences, which were not his primary areas of interest. Due to this, he enrolled in university.

In April 1897, Stresemann enrolled at the University of Berlin, where he was convinced by a businessman to study political economy instead of literature. During his university years, Stresemann also became active in the Burschenschaften movement of student fraternities, and became editor, in April 1898, of the Allgemeine Deutsche Universitäts-Zeitung, a newspaper run by Konrad Kuster, a leader in the liberal portion of the Burschenschaften. His editorials for the paper were often political, and dismissed most of the contemporary political parties as broken in one way or another.  In these early writings, he set out views that combined liberalism with strident nationalism, a combination that would dominate his views for the rest of his life. In 1898, Stresemann left the University of Berlin, transferring to the University of Leipzig so that he could pursue a doctorate. He studied history and international Law, and took literature courses. Influenced by Dr. Martin Kriele, he also took courses in economics. In March 1899, he stopped being an editor for the Allgemeine Deutsche Universitäts-Zeitung. He completed his studies in January 1901, submitting a thesis on the bottled beer industry in Berlin, which received a relatively high grade, but was a subject of mockery from colleagues. Stresemann's doctoral supervisor was the economist Karl Bücher. 

In 1902, Stresemann founded the Saxon Manufacturers' Association. In 1903 he married Käte Kleefeld (1883–1970), daughter of a wealthy Jewish Berlin businessman, and the sister of Kurt von Kleefeld, the last person in Germany to  be ennobled (in 1918). At that time he was also a member of Friedrich Naumann's National-Social Association. In 1906 he was elected to the Dresden town council. Though he had initially worked in trade associations, Stresemann soon became a leader of the National Liberal Party in Saxony. In 1907, he was elected to the Reichstag, where he soon became a close associate of party chairman Ernst Bassermann. However, his support of expanded social welfare programs did not sit well with some of the party's more conservative members, and he lost his post in the party's executive committee in 1912. Later that year he lost both his Reichstag and town council seats. He returned to business and founded the German-American Economic Association. In 1914 he returned to the Reichstag. He was exempted from war service due to poor health.  With Bassermann kept away from the Reichstag by either illness or military service, Stresemann soon became the National Liberals' de facto leader.  After Bassermann's death in 1917, Stresemann succeeded him as the party leader.

World War I
The evolution of his political ideas appears somewhat erratic. Initially, in the German Empire, Stresemann was associated with the left wing of the National Liberals. He initially believed in the maintenance of a balance of power between the British Empire, the United States, and Germany, whom he believed would be the world's economic superpowers in the future. Yet he also supported the Anglo-German naval arms race, believing that the expansion of the Imperial German Navy was necessary to protect German international trade. 

During World War I, he gradually moved to the right, expressing his support of the Hohenzollern monarchy and Germany's expansionist goals. He believed that Germany would need to annex the Low Countries, Eastern Europe, parts of north-east France, and the French protectorate in Morocco in order to economically compete with the United States in the future. He was a vocal proponent of unrestricted submarine warfare. However, he still favoured an expansion of the social welfare programme, and also supported an end to the restrictive Prussian three-class franchise. In 1916, he visited Constantinople and learned about the Ottoman Empire's Armenian genocide, writing in his diary: "Armenian reduction 1–1  million." Stresemann recommended the recall of the German ambassador, Paul Wolff Metternich, accusing him of being too sympathetic to Armenians.

The collapse of the German Empire after its defeat in World War I and the German Revolution of 1918–1919 drove Stresemann into a mental and physical breakdown, which shocked him into totally abandoning his earlier militarism and annexationism. When the Allied powers' peace terms became known, including a crushing burden of paying reparations for the war, Constantin Fehrenbach denounced them and claimed "the will to break the chains of slavery would be implanted" into a generation of Germans. Stresemann said of this speech: "He was inspired in that hour by God to say what was felt by the German people. His words, spoken under Fichte's portrait, the final words of which merged into Deutschland, Deutschland über alles, made it an unforgettably solemn hour. There was in that sense a kind of uplifting grandeur. The impression left on all was tremendous".

After the war, Stresemann briefly joined the German Democratic Party, formed from a merger of the Progressives with the left wing of the National Liberals. However, he was quickly expelled for his association with the right wing. He then gathered the main body of the old National Liberal Party—including most of its centre and right factions—into the German People's Party (DVP), with himself as chairman. Most of its support came from middle class and upper class Protestants. The DVP platform promoted Christian family values, secular education, lower tariffs, opposition to welfare spending and agrarian subsidies and hostility to "Marxism" (that is, the Communists, and also the Social Democrats).

The DVP was initially seen, along with the German National People's Party, as part of the "national opposition" to the Weimar Republic, particularly for its grudging acceptance of democracy and its ambivalent attitude towards the Freikorps and the Kapp Putsch in 1920. Beginning in 1919, Stresemann emphasized that Germany should try to regain its great-power status by leveraging the continued global economic influence and creditworthiness of its multinational corporations, pursuing peaceful economic expansion, and establishing friendly relations with the United States. By late 1920, Stresemann gradually moved to cooperation with the parties of the left and centre — possibly in reaction to political murders like that of Walther Rathenau.  However, he remained a monarchist at heart.

Weimar Republic

Chancellor 1923
On 13 August 1923, Stresemann was appointed chancellor and foreign minister of a grand coalition government in the so-called year of crises (1923). In social policy, a new system of binding arbitration was introduced in October 1923 in which an outside arbitrator had the final say in industrial disputes. 

On the 26 September 1923, Stresemann announced the end to the passive resistance against the Occupation of the Ruhr by the French and Belgians, in tandem with an Article 48 (of the Weimar Constitution) state of emergency proclamation by President Friedrich Ebert that lasted until February 1924. In October 1923, the Stresemann government used Article 48 to replace the illegally-elected SPD-Communist coalition government of Saxony on 29 October, and that of Thuringia on 6 November, by commissioners. By this time, Stresemann was convinced that accepting the republic and reaching an understanding with the Allies on the reparations issue was the only way for Germany to gain the breathing room it needed to rebuild its battered economy. He also wished to recover the Allied-occupied Rhineland, as he wrote to Wilhelm, the former German Crown Prince on 23 July 1923: "The most important objective of German politics is the liberation of German territory from French and Belgian occupation. First, we must remove the strangler from our throat".

Hyperinflation in the Weimar Republic reached its peak in November 1923. Since Germany was no longer able to pay the striking workers, more and more money was printed, which finally led to hyperinflation. Stresemann introduced a new currency, the Rentenmark, to end hyperinflation. He also persuaded the French to pull back from the Ruhr in return for a promise that reparations payments would resume. That was part of his larger strategy of "fulfillment." Although he, like nearly every other German politician, cursed the Treaty of Versailles as a Diktat, he had come to believe that Germany would never win relief from its terms unless it made a good-faith effort to fulfill them. To his mind, this would convince the Allies that the reparations bill was truly beyond Germany's capacity. The effort paid off; the Allies began to take a look at reforming the reparations scheme.

In early November 1923, partly because of the reaction to the overthrowing of the SPD/KPD governments in Saxony and Thuringia, the Social Democrats withdrew from his reshuffled government and, after a motion of confidence, he was voted down on 23 November 1923, after which Stresemann and his cabinet resigned.

Foreign minister 1923–1929
Stresemann remained as foreign minister in the government of his successor, Wilhelm Marx from the Centre Party. He remained foreign minister for the rest of his life in eight successive governments ranging from the centre-right to the centre-left. As foreign minister, Stresemann had numerous achievements. His first notable achievement was the Dawes Plan of 1924, which reduced Germany's overall reparations commitment and reorganized the Reichsbank. He appointed Hjalmar Schacht as the new President of the Reichsbank, who implemented the Dawes Plan and ended Weimar hyperinflation despite his reservations over Germany's growing foreign debt under Stresemann's economic policies. The successful negotiation of the Dawes Plan provided hope for Streseman's foreign policy strategy emphasizing Germany's remaining economic soft power, since the creator of the plan Owen D. Young was the chairman of General Electric and a major trading partner with the German firm AEG. 

After Sir Austen Chamberlain became British Foreign Secretary, Stresemann wanted a British guarantee to France and Belgium, as the Anglo-American guarantee had fallen due to the United States' refusal to ratify the Treaty of Versailles. Stresemann later wrote: "Chamberlain had never been our friend. His first act was to attempt to restore the old Entente through a three-power alliance of England, France and Belgium, directed against Germany. German diplomacy faced a catastrophic situation".

Stresemann conceived the idea that Germany would guarantee her western borders and pledge never to invade Belgium and France again, along with a guarantee from Britain that they would come to Germany's aid if attacked by France. Germany was in no position at the time to attack, as Stresemann wrote to the Crown Prince: "The renunciation of a military conflict with France has only a theoretical significance, in so far as there is no possibility of a war with France". Stresemann negotiated the Locarno Treaties with Britain, France, Italy, and Belgium. On the third day of negotiations, Stresemann explained Germany's demands to the French Foreign Secretary, Aristide Briand. As Stresemann recorded, Briand "almost fell off his sofa, when he heard my explanations". Stresemann said that Germany alone should not make sacrifices for peace; European countries should cede colonies to Germany; the disarmament control commission should leave Germany; the Anglo-French occupation of the Rhineland should be ended; and Britain and France should disarm as Germany had done. The Treaties were signed in October 1925 at Locarno. Germany officially recognized the post-World War I western border for the first time, was guaranteed peace with France, and was promised admission to the League of Nations and evacuation of the last Allied occupation troops from the Rhineland.

Stresemann was not willing to conclude a similar treaty with the Second Polish Republic: "There will be no Locarno of the east" he said in 1925. However, in 1925 he did sign arbitration agreements with both Poland and the First Czechoslovak Republic to ensure that any future conflict would be settled by impartial arbitration, rather than by the use of force.  By 1929 his policy was “detente with Poland,” and strengthening good economic relationships. 

After this reconciliation with the Versailles powers, Stresemann moved to improve relations with the Soviet Union. He said to Nikolay Krestinsky in June 1925, as recorded in his diary: "I had said I would not come to conclude a treaty with Russia so long as our political situation in the other direction was not cleared up, as I wanted to answer the question whether we had a treaty with Russia in the negative". The Treaty of Berlin signed in April 1926 reaffirmed and strengthened the Treaty of Rapallo signed in 1922. In September 1926, Germany was admitted to the League of Nations as permanent member of the Security Council. This was a sign that Germany was quickly becoming a normal state, and assured the Soviet Union of Germany's sincerity in the Treaty of Berlin.

Stresemann was co-winner of the Nobel Peace Prize in 1926 for these achievements. Gustav Stresemann's success owed much to his friendly personal character and his willingness to be pragmatic. He was close personal friends with many influential foreigners. The most noted was Briand, with whom he shared the Peace Prize.

Stresemann wrote to the Crown Prince: "All the questions which to-day preoccupy the German people can be transformed into as many vexations for the Entente by a skilful orator before the League of Nations". As Germany now had a veto on League resolutions, she could gain concessions from other countries on modifications on the Polish border or Anschluss with Austria, as other countries needed her vote. Germany could now act as "the spokesman of the whole German cultural community" and thereby provoke the German minorities in Czechoslovakia and Poland.

Germany signed the Kellogg-Briand Pact in August 1928. It renounced the use of violence to resolve international conflicts. Although Stresemann did not propose the pact, Germany's adherence convinced many people that Weimar Germany was a Germany that could be reasoned with. This new insight was instrumental in the Young Plan of February 1929, which led to more reductions in German reparations payment.

Stresemann was not, however, in any sense pro-French. His main preoccupation was how to free Germany from the burden of reparations payments to France, imposed by the Treaty of Versailles. His strategy for this was to forge close economic ties with the United States. The U.S. was Germany's main source of money and raw materials, and one of Germany's largest export markets for manufactured goods. Germany's economic recovery was thus in the interests of the U.S., and gave the U.S. an incentive to help Germany resolve the reparations burden. The Dawes and Young plans were the result of this strategy. New York bankers loaned large sums to Germany, which used the dollars to pay reparations to France and Britain, which in turn paid their war loans they owed to Washington. Stresemann also hoped to use the United States' new financial involvement in the German economy to incentivize the nation's financial and political institutions to support reform of reparations. This paid off in 1928 when Federal Reserve Chairman Benjamin Strong shepherded forward the Young Plan. Stresemann had a close relationship with Herbert Hoover, who was Secretary of Commerce in 1921-28 and President from 1929. This strategy worked remarkably well until it was derailed by the Great Depression after Stresemann's death.

During his period in the foreign ministry, Stresemann came more and more to accept the Republic, which he had at first rejected. By the mid-1920s, having contributed much to a (temporary) consolidation of the feeble democratic order, Stresemann was regarded as a Vernunftrepublikaner (republican by reason), someone who accepted the republic as the least of all evils but was in his heart still loyal to the monarchy. The conservative opposition criticized him for his supporting the republic and fulfilling too willingly the demands of the Western powers. Along with Matthias Erzberger and others, he was attacked as a Erfüllungspolitiker ("fulfillment politician"). Indeed, some of the more conservative members of his own People's Party never really trusted him.

In 1925, when he first proposed an agreement with France, he made it clear that in doing so he intended to "gain a free hand to secure a peaceful change of the borders in the East and [...] concentrate on a later incorporation of German territories in the East". In the same year, while Poland was in a state of political and economic crisis, Stresemann began a trade war against the country. Stresemann hoped for an escalation of the Polish crisis, which would enable Germany to regain territories ceded to Poland after World War I, and he wanted Germany to gain a larger market for its products there. So Stresemann refused to engage in any international cooperation that would have "prematurely" restabilized the Polish economy. In response to a British proposal, Stresemann wrote to the German ambassador in London: "[A] final and lasting recapitalization of Poland must be delayed until the country is ripe for a settlement of the border according to our wishes and until our own position is sufficiently strong". According to Stresemann's letter, there should be no settlement "until [Poland's] economic and financial distress has reached an extreme stage and reduced the entire Polish body politic to a state of powerlessness". Stresemann hoped to annex Polish territories in Greater Poland, take over whole eastern Upper Silesia and parts of Central Silesia and the entire so called Polish Corridor. Besides waging economic war on Poland, Streseman funded extensive propaganda efforts and plotted to collaborate with the Soviet Union against Polish statehood.

According to historian Gordon Craig: No German statesman since Bismarck's time had demonstrated, as brilliantly as he was to do, the ability to sense danger and to avoid it by seizing and retaining the initiative, the gift of maintaining perspective and a sense of relative values in the midst of a changing diplomatic situation, and the talent for being more stubborn than his partners in negotiation and for refusing to allow their importunities to force him to accept second-best solutions.

Health decline and death

In 1928, Stresemann's poor health worsened after the mainstream national conservative parties lost seats to the SDP in the 1928 German federal election. He successfully negotiated a Grand Coalition government led by Chancellor Hermann Müller in which he remained Foreign Secretary, but was weakened in doing so. 

Stresemann's Atlanticist foreign policy also began to show fractures after the Young Plan failed to reduce reparations annuities as far as hoped and refused to establish a linkage between Allied war debts to the United States and German reparations payments. He seemed to win a victory when his friend Hoover won the 1928 United States presidential election, but his administration enacted a protectionist trade policy to assist U.S. agriculture and signed the Smoot–Hawley Tariff Act. The new trade barriers lessened U.S. credit to Germany. 

Discontent with the Young Plan led to the growth of far-right movements rejecting liberal democracy such as the Nazi Party, with Stresemann weakening himself further by keeping the right wing of the DVP under control. Stresemann responded to worsening trans-Atlantic relations by pursuing negotiations for closer relations with the United Kingdom and France, and in 1929 spoke positively of the idea of European integration to form a united political and economic counterweight against the United States. However, he died before he could make any further diplomatic progress towards this idea. 

Stresemann died of a series of strokes on 3 October 1929 at the age of 51, just hours after convincing the Reichstag to accept the Young Plan. His gravesite is situated in the Luisenstadt Cemetery at Südstern in Berlin Kreuzberg, and includes work by the German sculptor Hugo Lederer.

Stresemann and his wife Käte had two sons, Wolfgang, who later became intendant of the Berliner Philharmoniker, and Joachim Stresemann.

Stresemann was a freemason initiated in the masonic lodge Frederick the Great (in German, Friedrich der Große) in Berlin in 1923. His masonic membership was generally known to his contemporaries and he was criticized by German nationalists as a "lodge politician".

Fashion
Stresemann popularized the style of substituting a short dark lounge-suit jacket for a morning coat but otherwise wearing morning dress for men's day wear.  The look became so identified with Stresemann that such outfits are often called "Stresemanns."

See also
 Gustav Stresemann Institute
List of people from Berlin

References

Bibliography
 Cornebise, Alfred E. "Gustav Stresemann and the Ruhr Occupation: the Making of a Statesman." European Studies Review 2.1 (1972): 43-67.
 
 

 Feuchtwanger, Edgar. "Hitler, Stresemann and the Discontinuity of German Foreign Policy." History Review (1999)  35:14+ online.
 Feuchtwanger, Edgar. "From Weimar to Hitler: Germany, 1918-33 (2nd ed. 1995)
 
 

 Jacobson, Jon. Locarno diplomacy: Germany and the west, 1925–1929 (Princeton UP, 1972) excerpt.
 Machalka, Wolfgang, and Marshall Lee, eds. Gustav Stresemann (1982), essays by scholars
 
 Nekrich, Aleksandr Moiseevich. Pariahs, partners, predators: German-Soviet relations, 1922-1941 (Columbia University Press, 1997).

 
 
 

 Steiner, Zara. The Lights that Failed: European International History 1919—1933 (Oxford, 2005); 960 pp.
 Thimme, Annelise.  "Stresemann and Locarno" in Hans Wilhelm Gatzke, ed., European diplomacy between two wars, 1919-1939 (1972) pp 73-93 online 
 
  online, focuses on domestic politics.
 
 
 
 Wright, Jonathan. "Gustav Stresemann: Weimar's Greatest Statesman." History Today (Nov 2002), 52#11 pp 53–59.
 Wright, Jonathan. "Stresemann and Weimar" History Today (Oct 1989) 39#10, pp 35–41;

Historiography
 Enssle, Manfred J. "Stresemann's Diplomacy Fifty Years after Locarno: Some Recent Perspectives." Historical Journal 20.4 (1977): 937-948 online.
 Gatzke, Hans W. "Gustav Stresemann: A Bibliographical Article." Journal of Modern History 36#1 (1964): 1-13. in JSTOR
 Grathwol, Robert. "Stresemann revisited." European Studies Review 7.3 (1977): 341-352.
 Grathwol, Robert. “Gustav Stresemann: Reflections on His Foreign Policy.” Journal of Modern History, 45#1 (1973), pp. 52–70. online

Primary sources
 Stresemann, Gustav. Essays and speeches on various subjects (1968) online
 Sutton, Eric ed. Gustav Stresemann his diaries, letters and papers (1935) online

In German
 Becker, Hartmuth: Gustav Stresemann: Reden und Schriften. Politik – Geschichte – Literatur, 1897–1926. Duncker & Humblot, Berlin 2008, .
 Birkelund, John P.: Gustav Stresemann. Patriot und Staatsmann. Eine Biographie. Europa-Verlag, Hamburg 2003, .
Braun, Bernd: Die Reichskanzler der Weimarer Republik. Zwölf Lebensläufe in Bildern. Düsseldorf 2011, p. 270–303.
 
 Kolb, Eberhard: Stresemann, Gustav. In: Neue Deutsche Biographie (NDB). Band 25, Duncker & Humblot, Berlin 2013, S. 545–547 (Digitalisat  (PDF; 3,7 MB)).
 Pohl, Karl Heinrich: Gustav Stresemann. Biografie eines Grenzgängers.'' Vandenhoeck & Ruprecht, Göttingen 2015, .

External links

 
 
 
 

1878 births
1929 deaths
20th-century Chancellors of Germany
Politicians from Berlin
People from the Province of Brandenburg
European conservative liberals
German Protestants
National-Social Association politicians
National Liberal Party (Germany) politicians
German Democratic Party politicians
German People's Party politicians
Chancellors of Germany
Foreign Ministers of Germany
Members of the 12th Reichstag of the German Empire
Members of the 13th Reichstag of the German Empire
Members of the Weimar National Assembly
Members of the Reichstag of the Weimar Republic
German anti-communists
German diplomats
Nobel Peace Prize laureates
German Nobel laureates
Humboldt University of Berlin alumni